Vazhoor Soman is an Indian politician from Kerala and a member of the Communist Party of India. He is a member of the Kerala Legislative Assembly from  Peerumade.

References

Communist Party of India politicians from Kerala
Living people
Year of birth missing (living people)
Kerala MLAs 2021–2026